Written In Song is the sixteenth studio album by American country artist Jeannie Seely. It was released on January 13, 2017 on Cheyenne Records and was produced by Seely. It is her first studio release in six years and the second to be issued on her own label. The album consisted of songs Seely composed for other artists. There are also several songs included that had not been released before.

Background and content
The concept behind Written in Song came from disc jockey Eddie Stubbs and artist Kenny Sears. Both individuals thought that Seely should release an album of self-written songs. "...Kenny said, ‘You don’t need to look anywhere. You need to record your own.’ And Eddie Stubbs was just persistent that I should do a whole album singing the songs I had written myself," she commented. Seely produced album by herself in the Nashville, Tennessee area, specifically at Hilltop Studios. She chose to record the album with a full band altogether in a live format. "I still like the atmosphere, I like the incentive, I like the excitement and the emotion of all of us doing it together. I am a team player, always have been," she said in 2017.

The album consisted of 14 tracks, all of which were written or co-written by Seely. Many of the album's tracks had previously been cut by other recording artists. The second track, "He's All I Need", was first recorded by Dottie West (whom Seely composed the track with). The eleventh track, "Life of a Rodeo Cowboy", was first recorded by Merle Haggard. The fourth track, "Senses", was first recorded by Willie Nelson. The album also features collaborations with other artists. On the song "Senses", Connie Smith and Marty Stuart provide harmony vocals. On the fourteenth track, "We're Still Hangin' in There Ain't We Jessi", Jessi Colter and Jan Howard are featured duet partners.

Release and reception
Written in Song was officially released on January 13, 2017 via Cheyenne Records, Seely's own label. It was released to stores in a compact disc format and online in a digital format. On its release day, Seely and her management hosted a "CD release party" in Nashville to celebrate it.

Written in Song was positively reviewed by music critics and journalists. Markos Papadatos of the Digital Journal praised the album's diverse array of tracks. He called the fourth track a "classic ballad" and the song "My Love for You" something "reminiscent of Bette Midler". Papadatos concluded by saying, "Overall, Jeannie Seely soars on her new album, Written in Song. "Miss Country Soul" is back stronger than ever. There is a variety on her latest musical effort. It garners an A rating." The album was also reviewed positively by the Nashville Country Clubs Margaret Rogers. In the review, Rogers commented that Seely's "sultry" voice was "not lost" in the album. "Jeannie Seeley’s newest album Written in Song perfectly captures a traditional yet modern sound. She makes songs written in the 70s sound timeless and shows tribute to her roots while recording songs that are relatable today," Rogers concluded.

Track listing

Personnel
All credits are adapted from Allmusic and the liner notes of Written in Song.Musical personnel Tim Atwood – piano
 Eddie Bayers – drums, mastering
 Jimmy Capps – rhythm guitar
 Jessi Colter – duet vocals
 Danny Davis – bass
 Doug Grieves – guitar
 Jan Howard – background vocals
 Kenny Sears – fiddle
 Tessa Sears – background vocals on "Leavin' And Sayin' Goodbye" 
 Jeannie Seely – lead vocals, background vocals 
 Connie Smith – harmony vocals 
 Marty Stuart – background vocals, guitar
 Dennis Wage – keyboards
 Tommy White – steel guitarTechnical personnel'
 Eddie Bayers – mastering
 Ron Harman – web service
 Chris Kagay – design
 John Nicholson – engineering
 Haley Nicole – photography
 Jeannie Seely – producer

Release history

References

2017 albums
Country albums by American artists
Albums produced by Jeannie Seely
Jeannie Seely albums